Omena-hotelli (Omena Hotels) is a Finnish low cost hotel chain. It is known for central location, cheap rates and self-service. There is no reception desk or receptionists in the hotels – rooms are booked and paid for on the internet. The customer then receives a passcode which unlocks the front door and the room for the duration of the stay.

Hotels
Tampere
Turku
Vaasa (2 hotels from 2020)
Helsinki (2 hotels)
Jyväskylä

References

External links
Official website (plain address redirects to Finnish version, also available in English, Swedish, Estonian and Russian)

Hotel chains in Finland